La doble vida de Estela Carrillo is a Mexican telenovela produced by Eduardo Meza, that premiered on 13 February 2017 on Las Estrellas. The first season was produced by Rosy Ocampo and consists of 72 episodes. It stars Ariadne Díaz as the titular character, alongside David Zepeda, África Zavala, Danilo Carrera and Erika Buenfil, in the main roles.

On May 9, 2017, Eduardo Meza confirmed that the series would be renewed for a second season.

On March 12, 2018, the magazine People en Español, confirmed that the telenovela had been canceled for the moment and that it is not yet planned to produce a second season, at least during 2018.

Synopsis 
The season tells the story of Laura Oviedo, an undocumented woman living in the United States under the identity of Estela Carrillo, who dreams of being the star of a musical band. However, destiny takes her to work as a teacher in Riverside, California, where she witnesses a shooting and, overnight, becomes a hero for having saved the lives of her students in it. However, her status makes her refuse to 
receive any recognition, for fear of being discovered.

Cast

Main 
 Ariadne Díaz as Estela Carrillo / Laura Oviedo: She is mother of Paloma and was a music teacher for a group of young Hispanics at a Foundation in Los Angeles, California before being fired.
 David Zepeda as Ryan Cabrera: He is the director and heir of "Furia Productions", the leading producing company of Mexican Regional music and events in Los Angeles.
 África Zavala as Morgana Santos: She is the lover of Danilo and ex-vocalist of the group Los jerarcas de la Sierra.
 Danilo Carrera as Danilo Cabrera: He is the son that Walter Cabrera had with his lover and half brother of Ryan; he leads the band of Los jerarcas de la Sierra.
 Erika Buenfil as Mercy Cabrera: She is the mother of Ryan and Walter's widow, with whom she founded Furia Productions many years ago.

Supporting, Recurring 
 Alejandro Tommasi as John Blake Green "Mr. Blake": He is a businessman, with the highest level of relations with US politicians and businessmen.
 Zaide Silvia Gutiérrez as Rosario Hinojosa: She is Estela's chosen family. Her maternal instinct has led her to become Paloma's "grandmother," and Estela's tireless companion and confidante.
 Vanessa Bauche as Leticia Jiménez: She befriends Estela as they are saved from a migratory raid.
 Marco Méndez as Asdrúbal Guerrero: He is the right arm of a famous money launderer known as El Dorado.
 Lourdes Reyes as Luisa Almeida: She is the faithful companion of Mr. Blake, of whom she has been grateful to save her life.
 Adrián Di Monte as Joe Hernández: He is the lawyer of Furia Productions. He is Mexican-American. He entered at a young age to work in Furia Productions, and with time became the protected one of Walter Cabrera.
 Mike Biaggio as Fausto Galindo: He is a man obsessed with money and owner of the bar "La Toña".
 Franklin Virgüez as El Talismán: He is one of the murderers who works for El Dorado.
 Claudia Ríos as Antonia Flores "La Toña": She is one of the criminals that manages a network of prostitution.
 Luis Uribe as Néstor Aguilera / Lucio Galván "El Dorado"
 Andrés Zuno as Tom: He was Leticia's violent husband before being killed by Danilo.
 Alex Perea as Tadeo: He's Leticia's only and oldest son who later reveals to be gay.
 Carlos Speitzer as Trinidad Huerta "El Calao": He is one of the men who works for El Dorado.
 Adriana Ahumada as María: Leticia's only daughter, who let her friends influence her and had a sexual relationship with a boy to "fit in".
 Tania Lizardo as Nina
 Armando Torrea as Steve
 Lara Campos as Paloma: Estela's daughter.
 Yanni Prado as Génesis: Estela's friend whom she met at Furia
 Ermis Cruz as Wilmer Gutiérrez "Chavalín": He helped Laura become Estela Carrillo by giving her a false identity.
 Omar Medina as Erasmo Quintanilla

 Marco Corleone as Xenófobo
 Luis Xavier as Soto
 Hector Cruz as Osiel
 Carlos Athié as Porfirio Pineda "El Barón"
 Mauricio de Montellano as Ausencio Granados
 Sara Corrales as Real Estela Carrillo "El Dorado"
 Juan Carlos Barreto as Don Silverio Pineda "El Sagrado"
 Delia Casanova as Doña Herminia
 Alfredo Adame as Don Pedro Carrillo González
 César Évora as Don Walter Cabrera
 Ramiro Fumazoni as Juez Andrew Norman

Production 
The telenovela officially confirmed the beginning of production on November 10, 2016.

Development 

The series is based on migration, the American dream, the regional and northern music, and narcotrafico. Rosy Ocampo confirmed that the series is based on facts of real life, and a case that happened to a Mexican woman in particular. While in the program, Todo para la mujer,  Ocampo stated, "I visited Tijuana, Monterrey, and several cities and Los Angeles, to look for interesting topics for the series and found the case of a woman in particular."
This would be the last production of Rosy Ocampo for the producing company Televisa, after she announced that she would not renew her contract. For the main theme of the series, Mexican singer Julión Álvarez was chosen, and he would also have a short participation. Los Cardenales de Nuevo León confirmed that their theme "Porque me ocultas" would be part of the soundtrack of the series and used for several scenes. On January 20, 2016, the debut of Ariadne Díaz as a singer was confirmed, with the theme "Para que tú me amaras", which is part of the telenovela.

Episodes

Series overview

Webisodes

Keep Calm Chavalín te ayuda (2017)

Chisme sobre rueda (2017)

Cocina de Chayo (2017)

Awards and nominations

References

External links 
 

Mexican telenovelas
Televisa telenovelas
2017 telenovelas
2017 Mexican television series debuts
2017 Mexican television series endings
Spanish-language telenovelas